Frey Wille GmbH & Co KG, originally branded as "Michaela Frey Emailmanufaktur", and now known as FreyWILLE, is an enamel jewellery manufacturer based in Vienna, Austria founded in 1951 by designer Michaela Frey. The label is known for its hand-decorated designs that are based on the works of 19th- and 20th-century artists, and for producing the world's finest fire enamel jewellery.

History 
The original Michaela Frey style of enamel ornamentation and fire enamel techniques was created in the 1960s by Viennese designer and company founder Michaela Frey, who refined the technique of fine enameling over several decades and ran a workshop dedicated to enamel jewellery and objets d'art. Frey died in the 1970s, at which point the company was taken over by her accountant, Dr. Friedrich Wille (Doctor of Law), who embarked on a successful period of expansion.

Current operations 

By 2010, FreyWille operated 200+ boutiques worldwide. By 2022, the company had 42 boutiques, mostly in Eastern Europe, and had engaged re-sellers. The company has its factory and offices in one building in central Vienna.

Product range
All FreyWILLE pieces are hand-made in Vienna. Until c 2010, under contract, FreyWILLE produced the enamel jewellery for Hermès. Its scarves are designed in Vienna and made in Italy; its watches are made in Switzerland and set with enamel pieces in Vienna. Until c 2014, FreyWILLE offered handbags, also made in Italy, which cost as much as $5000 (US). The company also sells  watches and Swiss-made writing instruments. By 2022, FreyWILLE had discontinued it's men's line, which had consisted of watches, rings, belts, ties and writing instruments.

Designs

FreyWILLE designs distinguish themselves through the use of innovative colorful motifs and the infusion of 24k gold. They are either designed with the original ideas of the company's artists, such as the "Ode to Joy of Life" collection, or by using motifs from mythology, such as the Egyptian collection, or based on the works of influential artists. 

In the 1990s the Fondation Monet in Giverny approached the company and asked them to create a collection inspired by Monet. Soon after, a collection was created for the Victoria and Albert Museum based on works by William Morris. Collections have also been created based on the works of Gustav Klimt, Friedensreich Hundertwasser, Czech artist Alphonse Mucha, Vincent van Gogh and Paul Gauguin.

References 

Fashion accessory brands
Manufacturing companies based in Vienna
Austrian brands
High fashion brands
Luxury brands
Watch brands
Design companies established in 1951
Manufacturing companies established in 1951
Austrian companies established in 1951
Shops in New York City
Privately held companies of Austria